Aaron Summers (born 2 August 1981), also known by the nickname of "Sum-Dog", is an Australian professional rugby league footballer for the Brisbane Broncos in the National Rugby League (NRL), and the Central Queensland Comets in the Queensland Cup. He is a Wales international. He has previously played for the Crusaders and Widnes Vikings.

Aaron Summers is an Australian-born (Gosford, New South Wales) rugby league player for the Brisbane Broncos in the NRL and the Central Queensland Comets in the Queensland Cup. He played the second half of the 2010 Queensland Cup Competition with the Sunshine Coast Sea Eagles.

He plays as a prop. He is a Wales international having Played against PNG at Brewery Field, Bridgend, Wales.[1]
 
He has previously played Jersey Flegg for the North Sydney Bears also Premier league for the South Sydney Rabbitohs. He played for Whitehaven RLFC, Celtic Crusaders[1] and Widnes Vikings in the English competition.[2]

References

External links
(archived by web.archive.org) Brisbane Broncos profile
(archived by web.archive.org) Central Queensland Comets profile

1981 births
Crusaders Rugby League players
Australian rugby league players
Australian people of Welsh descent
Wales national rugby league team players
Widnes Vikings players
Sunshine Coast Sea Eagles players
Rugby league props
Central Queensland Capras players
Living people